Confederated Tribes may refer to a number of associations of Indigenous peoples in the American part of the Pacific Northwest:

 Confederated Tribes of the Chehalis Reservation
 Confederated Tribes of the Colville Reservation
 Confederated Tribes of Coos, Lower Umpqua and Siuslaw Indians
 Confederated Tribes of the Grand Ronde Community of Oregon
 Confederated Salish and Kootenai Tribes of the Flathead Nation
 Confederated Tribes of Siletz Indians
 Confederated Tribes of the Umatilla Indian Reservation
 Confederated Tribes of Warm Springs
 Confederated Tribes and Bands of the Yakama Nation

Native American tribes in Washington (state)
Native American tribes in California